Oxford Township, Ohio may refer to:
Oxford Township, Butler County, Ohio
Oxford Township, Coshocton County, Ohio
Oxford Township, Delaware County, Ohio
Oxford Township, Erie County, Ohio
Oxford Township, Guernsey County, Ohio
Oxford Township, Tuscarawas County, Ohio

See also
Oxford Township (disambiguation)

Ohio township disambiguation pages